Lumberton School District may refer to:
 Lumberton Independent School District - Texas
 Lumberton Township School District - New Jersey
 Lumberton Public School District - Mississippi